The Tujunga Wash Greenway and Bike Path is a trail and stormwater mitigation project  in the Valley Village and Valley Glen neighborhoods of California’s San Fernando Valley. 

Tujunga Wash is a tributary of the Los Angeles River; Tujunga has its own tributary, Pacoima Wash. The wash was channelized for flood control by the U.S. Army Corps of Engineers in the 1950s. 

Created between 2007 and 2012, the -long greenbelt “takes urban runoff from the flood control channel and creates a new stream with some of the natural characteristics from the Tujunga Wash, while native plants in the streambed help clean the water and establish habitat for animals such as birds, frogs and lizards.” The naturalized side channel within the greenway is a bioswale that recharges groundwater with an average of  annually. The  riparian habitat lies within a -wide greenbelt. 

Designed to attract both “migratory birds and pedestrians,” the Los Angeles Times said the beautification project “combines art and nature,” with the art aspect being the sculpted metal gates at the bike path entrances and the Great Wall of Los Angeles mural that’s been called “a California history lesson in sixth-tenths of a mile.”

The road surface is mix of concrete, asphalt and gravel. 

At its southern terminus of Chandler Boulevard the Tujunga Wash Bike Path intersects with the  Orange Line Bikeway.

There are access points at the corner of Laurel Canyon Boulevard and Oxnard Street, as well as Fallbrook Avenue, Lassen Street, Coldwater Canyon Drive, Nordhoff Street, Saticoy Street, and DeSoto Avenue. One local guide advises, “There are crossings every quarter-mile or so, except for about one mile in between Coldwater Canyon and Busch Motorway, where there are no crossings until it hits Saticoy Street.”

See also
 List of Los Angeles bike paths
 Great Wall of Los Angeles
 Orange Line Bikeway

References

External links 
Maps

 Los Angeles Map & Guide: Upper River (PDF from FOLAR, Friends of the Los Angeles River)
 Los Angeles Bikeway Map (Metro.net) - HTML
  Los Angeles Bikeway Map (Metro.net) - PDF hosted on Dropbox

Info
 L.A. River Revitalization
 L.A. County: Tujunga Wash Greenway
 KCET: Where Art and Greenery Meet: Hiking Along the Tujunga Wash

 Recreational Use Reassessment of Engineered Channels of Los Angeles River (Oct. 2014), Los Angeles Regional Water Quality Control Board
Videos
 YouTube: Tujunga Wash Gravel Bike Path (2-min helmet cam)
 YouTube: tujunga wash bike path incl Great Wall of Los Angeles (8-min helmet cam)

Los Angeles River
Bike paths in Los Angeles
Parks in the San Fernando Valley
Transportation in the San Fernando Valley